Huge Stone(Lak Konrah) is a huge stone in torawari upper side area, native of torawari climb up on Lak konrah to see beautiful sights of torawari village.

References

Landmarks in Pakistan
Rock formations